Live in Ottawa is a posthumous live album by the Jimi Hendrix Experience, released on October 23, 2001 by Dagger Records. The album documents the band's second performance at the Capitol Theatre in Ottawa, Ontario, Canada, on March 19, 1968. Three tracks from the first set were later issued in September 2008 on Live in Paris & Ottawa 1968.

Track listing
All songs were written by Jimi Hendrix, except where noted.

Personnel
 Jimi Hendrixguitar, vocals
 Mitch Mitchelldrums
 Noel Reddingbass guitar, backing vocals

Live albums published posthumously
Jimi Hendrix live albums
2001 live albums
Dagger Records live albums